Saint Kyriakos the Anchorite (or Cyriacus the Anchorite also known as 'Cyriacus the Hermit') is a Christian saint.

Kyriakos (in Greek Κυριάκος) is also a given name and may refer to:

Kyriakos of Makuria, ruler of the Nubian kingdom of Makuria in 8th century
Kyriakos Mavronikolas (born 1955), Cypriot politician and government minister
Kyriakos Mitsotakis (born 1968), Greek politician and Prime Minister of Greece
Kyriakos Onisiforou (born 1951), Cypriot-born Greek sprinter
Kyriakos Papachronis (born 1960), also known as the "Ogre of Drama" (ο δράκος της Δράμας), a Greek serial killer
Kyriakos Papadopoulos (born 1992), Greek footballer
Kyriakos Pittakis (1798–1863), Greek archaeologist 
Kyriakos Tamvakis (born 1950), Greek theoretical physicist
Kyriakos Velopoulos (born 1965), Greek politician and MP

Kyriakos is also a surname and may refer to:

Anastasios Kyriakos (born 1978), Greek footballer 
Diomidis Kyriakos, a Greek vice-admiral who was killed in the siege of Messolonghi